The Horse Hills are a low mountain range in the eastern Mojave Desert, in eastern San Bernardino County, southern California.

Geography
The hills are protected within the Mojave National Preserve.

The Horse Hills are east of and across the Kelbaker Road from the Granite Mountains, and south of the Providence Mountains.  Interstate 40 and historic Route 66 are to the south.

References 

Mojave National Preserve
Mountain ranges of the Mojave Desert
Mountain ranges of San Bernardino County, California
Mountain ranges of Southern California